"Long Time Ago" is a song by Sweden-based musician and producer Dr. Alban, released in 1997 as the third single from his fifth studio album, I Believe (1997). It has been described as a typical Dr. Alban song, but updated to incorporate more progressive house and trance. The song peaked at number 15 in both Finland and Spain. Backing vocals are performed by Charlie King, Martina Edoff, Monica Lofgren and Therese Grankvist. German DJ/production team Sash! made remixes of the track. A music video was also produced to promote the single.

Track listing

Charts

References

 

1997 singles
1997 songs
CNR Music singles
Dr. Alban songs
English-language Swedish songs
Universal Records singles